Matt Kane (born Matthew Robert Kane, 18 January 1991) is an English actor, writer and director with US dual citizenship.

Early life
Kane was born in Bristol and educated at The Castle School, and attended acting classes at the ITV West Television Workshop in Bristol, where he performed in numerous theatre productions and short films.

Career
Kane is best known for playing the main role of 18-year-old Stephen Mackinnon in the BBC teen drama series The Cut, alongside Samuell Benta, Lara Goodison, Connor Scarlett and Tosin Cole. He appeared prominently in the first two seasons of the drama series, but had a less important role in Series 3, appearing in four episodes out of twelve. His acting experience includes appearances in the BBC drama Casualty, Channel 4's Skins, the independent film The Dinosaur Project as Luke, Jace in ABC Family's Switched at Birth and as John Darling in Season 3 of ABC's Once Upon a Time. His feature directorial debut Auggie was released by Samuel Goldwyn Films in 2019.

Filmography
 The Last of Robin Hood (2013)
 Once Upon a Time- John Darling
 Switched at Birth- Jace
 The Dinosaur Project
 Trust Fund (2016)
 Auggie (2019) as director/writer

References

External links

1991 births
Living people
English male film actors
English male comedians
Male actors from Bristol
People educated at The Castle School
English male television actors
American male film actors
American male comedians
21st-century American comedians
American male television actors
English emigrants to the United States